Ildar is a given name of hybrid Turkic-Persian origin (Turkic İl="nation"; Persian dar="a suffix indicating ownership in compound words"). It is common among Tatars in Russia and other minorities of Muslim heritage. The name may refer to:

Ildar Abdrazakov (born 1976), Grammy Award-winning operatic bass singer
Ildar Akhmetzyanov (born 1983), Russian professional football player
Ildar Amirov (born 1987), Kyrgyzstani footballer and striker
Ildar Bikchantayev (born 1990), Russian professional footballer
Ildar Fatchullin (born 1982), Russian ski jumper
Ildar Garifullin (born 1963), former Soviet/Russian Nordic combined skier
Ildar Gizatullin (born 1976), Russian professional football coach and a former player
Ildar Hafizov (born 1988), amateur Uzbekistani Greco-Roman wrestler in the men's featherweight category
Ildar Ibragimov (born 1967), chess Grandmaster
Ildar Isangulov (born 1992), Russian ice hockey defenceman
Ildar Khairullin (born 1990), Russian chess Grandmaster
Ildar Magdeev (born 1984), Uzbek footballer
Ildar Minshin (born 1985), Russian track and field athlete mainly in the 3000 metres steeplechase
Ildar Mukhometov, Russian professional ice hockey goaltender
Ildar Nugumanov (born 1988), Russian futsal player
Ildar Pomykalov, paralympian athlete from Russia, mainly in category T12 long-distance events
 Ildar Rakhmatullin (racing driver) (born 1986), Russian racing driver
Ildar Shabayev (born 1985), Russian professional football player

See also
Dildar (disambiguation)
Havildar
Idar
Ildjarn
Zaildar